is a fictional monster, or kaiju, which first appeared in Ishirō Honda's 1965 film Frankenstein vs. Baragon, produced and distributed by Toho. Depicted as a four-legged, horned dinosaur-like creature with large ears, Baragon appeared alongside Godzilla and other monster characters in films in the Godzilla franchise, also produced by Toho, including Destroy All Monsters and Godzilla, Mothra and King Ghidorah: Giant Monsters All-Out Attack.

Overview

Showa series
In the film Frankenstein vs. Baragon, Baragon is depicted as a kaiju that evolved from the fictional dinosaur Baranosdragon and burrowed underground to escape the extinction of the dinosaurs and other prehistoric creatures. It adapted and survived over the years but when the sounds of a nearby factory disturb and awaken him during the events of the film, Baragon emerges from underground and attacks the factory. It later attacks and destroys a village and eats all of a farm's livestock. As Baragon was not sighted in the attacks, the mutant human Frankenstein was blamed for them until a survivor of the factory attack came forward, citing a different monster attacked him. While searching for Frankenstein, a group of scientists set off explosives, which attracts Baragon. It attacks the scientists, but Frankenstein arrives to protect them. The two engage each other in battle, with the latter defeating Baragon by breaking its neck before a fissure opens and swallows both combatants.

In the film Destroy All Monsters, a different, smaller Baragon appears as one of several of Earth's monsters kept in captivity on Monster Island. They are later brainwashed by the alien Kilaaks and sent to destroy Earth's major cities as part of their invasion, but a group of human astronauts destroy the Kilaaks' control device. In retaliation, the aliens send King Ghidorah to kill Earth's monsters. Most of them engage and eventually kill the space dragon in combat, though Baragon did not take part in either. Following this, Earth's monsters returned to Monster Island to live in peace.

Millennium series
In the film Godzilla, Mothra and King Ghidorah: Giant Monsters All-Out Attack, Baragon is depicted as one of Japan's three ancient guardian monsters who were killed years prior by Japanese warriors, who prayed for them to return to save Japan. When Godzilla is revived by the vengeful souls of the people who died in World War II, Baragon and his fellow guardians Mothra and King Ghidorah are revived to confront him. While the three are ultimately killed in battle, they weaken Godzilla enough for Admiral Taizo Tachibana of the Japan Self-Defense Forces (JSDF) to kill it in turn.

Abilities
All incarnations of Baragon are adept burrowers, with the Millennium incarnation being referred to as the "God of the Earth". The aforementioned incarnation can also leap great distances. Additionally, the Showa version can fire a heat ray from its mouth, though in the Atari games, the beam comes from its horn.

Appearances

Films
 Frankenstein vs. Baragon (1965)
 Destroy All Monsters (1968)
 Aadi Yug (1978; stock footage cameo)
 Godzilla, Mothra and King Ghidorah: Giant Monsters All-Out Attack (2001)
 Godzilla: Final Wars (2004; stock footage cameo)
 Pacific Rim Uprising (2018; skull)

Television
 Godzilla Island (1997-1998)
 Godziban (2019-present)

Video games
 Godzilla: Monster of Monsters (NES - 1988)
 Godzilla / Godzilla-Kun: Kaijuu Daikessen (Game Boy - 1990)
 Godzilla 2: War of the Monsters (NES - 1991)
 Godzilla Trading Battle (PlayStation - 1998)
 Godzilla: Save the Earth (Xbox, PS2 - 2004)
 Godzilla: Unleashed (Wii - 2007)
 Godzilla Unleashed: Double Smash (NDS - 2007)
 Godzilla: Unleashed (PS2 - 2007)
 Godzilla Defense Force (2019)

Literature
 Godzilla vs. the Robot Monsters (novel - 1998)
 Godzilla: Ongoing (comic - 2012)
 Godzilla: Rulers of Earth (comic - 2013-2015)
 Godzilla: Monster Apocalypse (novel - 2017)
 Godzilla: Project Mechagodzilla (novel - 2018)

Cultural references
 The costume used for Baragon was reused three times in the original Ultraman, the suit was used to make both the monsters Neronga, Magura and Gabora, as well as being used once for Pagos in Ultra Q.
 Baragon appears via stock footage in the 1978 Indian B-movie Aadi Yug.
The Generation 1 Pokémon Nidoking is based on Baragon, and heavily resembles it.

References

Godzilla characters
Frankenstein characters
Fictional gods
Mothra characters
Toho monsters
Science fiction film characters
Fantasy film characters
Fictional characters with superhuman strength
Fictional monsters
Film characters introduced in 1965
Fictional dinosaurs
Kaiju
Fictional mutants
Horror film villains